6/12 may refer to:
June 12 (month-day date notation)
December 6 (day-month date notation)